Aradus crenatus is a species of flat bug in the family Aradidae. It is found in Central America, North America, and Europe.

References

Aradidae
Articles created by Qbugbot
Insects described in 1832